Paragon is the codename used by three unrelated fictional characters from Marvel Comics. The first was genetically engineered by the Enclave. The second was created as an original character for the video game Marvel Nemesis: Rise of the Imperfects. The third is a superhero and a member of Nebraska's Initiative team.

Paragon (Kismet)

Paragon (Maya) 

Paragon (Maya) is a fictional character from Electronic Arts who first appeared in Marvel Nemesis: Rise of the Imperfects.

Fictional character biography 
After a century-long search, a young Amazonian warrior, Maya, was chosen from an isolated, primitive, and forgotten society deep within the South American jungle. Matching a specifically required DNA structure, Maya was the perfect candidate for the ultimate weapon. Maya possessed a toxin free physical make-up, Amazonian warrior skills, and the instinctual savagery found at the core of all humanity.

Having acquired the perfect specimen, Niles Van Roekel ordered her to be put into a prolonged stasis. It would take years to successfully master the fusion of alien tech with humans before Roekel’s team would finally be ready to work on Maya.

After "The Imperfects" were completed, project Paragon was set in motion. Working in a secret facility, the aliens uploaded tactics and combat information into Maya’s brain. Her body was injected with chemicals to augment her already superior muscles and heighten her senses.

Training started shortly after. The girl was forced to fight and defend in various combat scenarios. Exercises were crafted to capitalize on and increase her natural ruthless brutality. It was always strike first and never ask questions. When her mind and body were at peak performance, the alien symbiote was grafted to her spine. The painful transformation intertwined and fused her nerves and muscles with Roekel's own race. It was a tremendous success as Paragon exceeded all of Roekel's expectations. She had become the ultimate killing machine.

But as Maya's awareness increased, so did her desire to escape her creator. The secret laboratory was nothing more than a prison and a threat to her future. Hence, during a particularly intense neural reprogramming session Paragon seized the chance to surprise her captors and violently blaze her way out of the facility.

Paragon ended up in New York. Afraid and confused, Paragon soon encountered Magneto during the Imperfect invasion of New York. Hazmat, however, took Paragon off to the New York City Subway with Magneto giving chase. A battle ensued which saw Magneto defeating Hazmat. After the battle, Magneto saw his chance to have Paragon join his cause in wiping out humanity and attempted to manipulate Paragon into joining him. Paragon, however, attacked Magneto and another battle ensued. This time, Paragon was successful in defeating Magneto.

Paragon, believing that Magneto had created her, asked him what he had done to her. Magneto reassured her he was not to blame for her suffering. Paragon asked who she was, Magneto replying by saying that she already knew that.

Paragon fought her way back into Van Roekel's headquarters and destroyed his means of creating any more Imperfects. Paragon and Van Roekel finally confronted one another and a fight between them soon began. Paragon defeated Van Roekel who told of his reasons for creating the Imperfects before he died.

After this she led the Imperfects to Roekel's Planet to free his homeworld.

Powers and abilities 
Paragon has superhuman strength, speed, stamina, and agility as well as invulnerability.  She can teleport and shoot energy blasts.  She has retractable blades capable of draining organic life-force.

Paragon (Cooper Roth) 

Cooper Roth is a fictional Marvel Comics character who first appeared in Iron Man vol. 4 #21 as a member of Captain Ultra's team.

Fictional character biography 
After investigating an unsolved crime with teammate Gadget, they ran across a formerly missing supervillain, Graviton. In a sudden flurry of violence, Roth was badly injured, requiring hospitalization and Gadget was killed. Graviton was taken into S.H.I.E.L.D. custody. After an investigation by Iron Man turned up evidence implicating Roth, Iron Man confronted Paragon and was subsequently attacked by Captain Ultra. In a following issue, it is revealed that Paragon is under the influence of the Mandarin, who manipulates him into believing that Graviton is responsible for the death of his mother. Roth then attempts to assassinate Graviton, who instead kills Roth before then taking his own life.

Powers and abilities 
He possesses invulnerability due to the ability to control his density, as well as flight, superhuman strength and speed.

References

External links 
 Paragon, Marvel Comics unofficial appreciation site.

Comics characters introduced in 2007
Marvel Comics cyborgs
Fictional hunters
Fictional indigenous people of the Americas
Fictional women soldiers and warriors
Marvel Comics American superheroes
Marvel Comics female supervillains
Marvel Comics male superheroes
Marvel Comics characters who can move at superhuman speeds
Marvel Comics characters who can teleport
Marvel Comics characters with superhuman strength
Video game characters introduced in 2005